Jade Te Rure (born 18 June 1993) is a New Zealand rugby union player who is currently signed for Yorkshire Carnegie in the English RFU Championship have previously played for Manawatu in the Mitre 10 Cup. He plays as a fly-half.

He previously played for Edinburgh in the Pro12.

Scottish-qualified, through his Edinburgh-born grandmother, Te Rure has played in the capital before as part of a touring under-18 side.

He played for New Zealand under-20s in the 2013 IRB Junior World Championship in France.

References

External links
 Edinburgh profile
 All Blacks profile

1993 births
Living people
New Zealand rugby union players
Manawatu rugby union players
Rugby union players from Palmerston North
New Zealand expatriate rugby union players
New Zealand expatriate sportspeople in Scotland
Expatriate rugby union players in Scotland
Edinburgh Rugby players
Rugby union fly-halves